Metro Express may refer to:

Metro Express (Chinese newspaper), a former newspaper published in Tianjin, China
MetroExpress (Halifax), a bus service in Halifax, Canada
Metro Express (Los Angeles County), an express bus service in Los Angeles, United States
Metro Express (Mauritius), a light rail transport service in Mauritius
Metro Express II, a former subsidiary of defunct airline holding company Metro Airlines
Metro ExpressLanes, a transport project taking place in Los Angeles, United States